Lizardo Antonio Garrido Bustamante (born August 25, 1957) is a retired football defender from Chile, who represented his native country at the 1982 FIFA World Cup, wearing the number two jersey. Nicknamed "El Chano", he played for several clubs in Chile, including Colo Colo, and in Mexico for Santos Laguna. For his country Garrido was capped 44 times between 1981 and 1991, scoring no goals.

Honours

Club
Colo-Colo
 Primera División de Chile (7): 1981, 1983, 1986, 1989, 1991, 1993, 1996
 Copa Chile (6): 1981, 1982, 1985, 1988, 1989, 1990
 Copa Libertadores (1): 1991
 Copa Interamericana (1): 1992
 Recopa Sudamericana (1): 1992

References

  Weltfussball profile

1957 births
Living people
Footballers from Santiago
Chilean footballers
Chilean expatriate footballers
Chile international footballers
Association football defenders
Colo-Colo footballers
Trasandino footballers
Deportes Colchagua footballers
Santos Laguna footballers
Expatriate footballers in Mexico
Chilean expatriate sportspeople in Mexico
Chilean Primera División players
Liga MX players
1982 FIFA World Cup players
1991 Copa América players